Maud Adams (born Maud Solveig Christina Wikström; 12 February 1945) is a Swedish actress and model, known for her roles as two different Bond girls, first in The Man with the Golden Gun (1974) and then as the title character in Octopussy (1983), as well as making many other appearances in both films and television including The Christian Licorice Store (1971), Rollerball (1975), Killer Force (1976), Merciless Man (1976), Hell Hunters (1986) and The Kill Reflex (1989).

Early life
Adams was born as Maud Solveig Christina Wikström in Luleå, Sweden, the daughter of Thyra, a government tax inspector, and Gustav Wikström, a comptroller. She is fluent in five languages, and at one time wanted to work as an interpreter. She was discovered in 1963 in a shop by a photographer who asked to take her picture, a picture he submitted to the Miss Sweden contest arranged by the magazine Allers; from there her modeling career took off.

Career
Adams moved to Paris and later to New York City to work for Eileen Ford. Her acting career started when she was asked to appear in the 1970 movie The Boys in the Band, in which she played a photo-shoot model in the opening credits. During the 1970s she guest-starred in such American TV series as Hawaii Five-O and Kojak.

Adams was catapulted to international fame as the doomed mistress of the villain (Christopher Lee) in The Man with the Golden Gun (1974). In short order she appeared in Norman Jewison's futuristic Rollerball (1975) and several European films, and she starred in the obsession thriller Tattoo (1981) with Bruce Dern. She was so well regarded by James Bond film series producer Albert Broccoli that she was asked to return in Octopussy in 1983, this time as a lead, the title character—an exotic and mysterious smuggler, again opposite Roger Moore. Adams had Swedish co-stars in her three Bond films: Britt Ekland as Mary Goodnight in The Man with the Golden Gun; in Octopussy both Kristina Wayborn as Magda, and Mary Stävin as an Octopussy girl; and in A View to a Kill (1985), in which she was an extra, Mary Stävin played agent Kimberley Jones, and Dolph Lundgren played Venz. While portraying a Bond girl has not always indicated continued success as an actress, Adams comments, "Looking back on it, how can you not really enjoy the fact that you were a Bond Girl? It's pop culture and to be part of that is very nice."

Adams appeared in the U. S. television series Emerald Point NAS in 1983 and 1984, but was unable to sustain her high profile, falling back on second-rate material such as Jane and the Lost City in 1987. In September of that year she also appeared in Playboy in an issue on the Bond girls.

She hosted the Swedish TV show Kafé Luleå in 1994, and played a guest role in the Swedish soap opera Vita lögner in 1998.

She guest-starred in That '70s Show in 2000, appearing as a bridesmaid to Tanya Roberts, along with Kristina Wayborn (her Octopussy co-star) and Barbara Carrera; all four share the title of 'Bond girl'. 

She also was the president of a cosmetics company called Scandinavian Biocosmetics.

Personal life
Adams married photographer Roy Adams in 1966 and then divorced him in 1975. She married her current husband, private mediator and retired judge, Charles Rubin, in 1999. Adams has no children from either marriage.

Filmography

Films

Television

As director
 Kafé Luleå (1994) (TV series)

As herself
 Food, Wine & Friends (1979)
 Miss USA Pageant (1979) (judge)
 Women Who Rate a 10 (1981)
 Battle of the Network Stars XI (1981)
 Så ska det låta (1997) (TV episode)
 The James Bond Story (1999)
 The Men Behind the Mayhem: The Special Effects of James Bond (2000)
 Inside 'The Man with the Golden Gun' (2000)
 Inside 'Octopussy'  (2000)
 Inside 'A View to a Kill'  (2000)
 Bond Girls are Forever (2002) (TV)
 Premiere Bond: Die Another Day (2002)
 James Bond: A BAFTA Tribute (2002)
 Stjärnorna på slottet (2006) (5 TV episodes)
 Ann-Margret: Från Valsjöbyn till Hollywood (2014)
 From Rollerball to Rome (2020)
 For Our Eyes Only: John Glenn (2021)

References

External links
 
 
 Maud Adams on Bond Stars
 Maud Adams at From Sweden with Love
 

1945 births
Living people
People from Luleå
Swedish female models
Swedish film actresses
20th-century Swedish actresses
21st-century Swedish actresses
Swedish television actresses